Northampton South is a constituency represented in the House of Commons of the UK Parliament since 2017 by Andrew Lewer, a Conservative.

History

This constituency was created for the election of February 1974 when the old constituency of Northampton was split into Northampton South and Northampton North.

Since creation it is generally a marginal and in elections since 1979 but one, in 2005, has been a bellwether, electing an MP from the winning (or largest governing) party.

The one-time Deputy Speaker of the House, Michael Morris, a Conservative, held this seat from its creation in 1974 until 1997, when Tony Clarke defeated Morris in a surprise result (one of many in the Labour landslide of that year) to gain the seat for Labour with a majority of just 744. The Almanac of British Politics described Labour's gain of the seat as "one of the most unexpected results of the 1997 election", despite the fact that Labour had come close to winning the seat in both 1974 elections. Clarke only just increased his majority in 2001, but Brian Binley defeated Clarke to regain the seat for the Conservatives in 2005 with a comfortable majority, and held it until 2015 when he retired and fellow Conservative David Mackintosh held the seat.  Mackintosh retired at the 2017 snap election after just one Parliament, after facing the prospect of being deselected by his local constituency party, and Andrew Lewer took over with a decreased majority from 2015 of over 1,000.

Boundaries

1974–1983: The County Borough of Northampton wards of Castle, Delapre, Duston, St Crispin, South, and Weston.

1983–1997: The Borough of Northampton wards of Billing, Castle, Delapre, Nene Valley, New Duston, Old Duston, St Crispin, South, and Weston, and the District of South Northamptonshire wards of Blisworth, Brafield, Bugbrooke, Cogenhoe, Gayton, Hackleton, Harpole, Heyford, Kislingbury, Milton, Roade, Salcey, and Yardley.

1997–2010: The Borough of Northampton wards of Billing, Castle, Delapre, Nene Valley, New Duston, Old Duston, St Crispin, South, and Weston, and the District of South Northamptonshire wards of Brafield, Cogenhoe, Hackleton, Harpole, Kislingbury, Milton, Roade, Salcey, and Yardley.

2010–present: The Borough of Northampton wards of Billing, Castle, Delapre, Ecton Brook, New Duston, Old Duston, St Crispin, St James, Spencer, and Weston.

South Northamptonshire is the 2010-created constituency in the county which absorbed the southern part of the 1997 version of this constituency.  Following the 2010 redistribution, the constituency is once again entirely within the Borough of Northampton as opposed to 1983 to 2010 when it also took in outlying rural parts outside the town.

Constituency profile
The constituency has income, social housing and unemployment statistics close to the national average and a varied and dynamic service and engineering-centred economy typical of the East Midlands with significant foodstuffs, clothing and consumables manufacturing and processing operations. Health inequality is high, with the life expectancy gap between the least deprived and most deprived men in northampton reaching over 10.2 years. Additionally, the constituency is 'considerably worse than [the] England average' in violent crime, self harm, under 18 conception and GCSE achievement.

Members of Parliament

Elections

Elections in the 2010s

Elections in the 2000s

Elections in the 1990s

Elections in the 1980s

Elections in the 1970s

See also
List of parliamentary constituencies in Northamptonshire

Notes

References

Parliamentary constituencies in Northamptonshire
Constituencies of the Parliament of the United Kingdom established in 1974
Politics of Northampton